Bruna Beatriz Benites Soares (born 16 October 1985), commonly known as Bruna Benites or simply Bruna, is a Brazilian footballer who plays as a defender for Campeonato Brasileiro de Futebol Feminino Série A1 club SC Internacional and the Brazil women's national team.

Club career
She played for Foz Cataratas and São José in Brazil.

In July 2016, she signed with Avaldsnes for one season.

On 30 November 2016 she signed with Houston Dash.

On 8 February  2018 she was  waived  by the Houston Dash.

International career
Bruna made her debut at the 2012 Summer Olympics. She received a yellow card against Great Britain and in the Quarter Final defeat to Japan. In May 2015 national team captain Bruna suffered an anterior cruciate ligament injury, which caused her to miss the 2015 FIFA Women's World Cup.

International goals

Personal life
She is a member of the Church of Jesus Christ of Latter-day Saints. She is also has a degree in Physiotherapy having studied at Universidade Catolica Dom Bosco in Campo Grande.

References

1985 births
Living people
Brazilian women's footballers
Women's association football defenders
Olympic footballers of Brazil
Footballers at the 2012 Summer Olympics
Footballers at the 2016 Summer Olympics
Brazilian Latter Day Saints
People from Cuiabá
Brazil women's international footballers
São José Esporte Clube (women) players
Toppserien players
Avaldsnes IL players
Expatriate women's footballers in Norway
Brazilian expatriate sportspeople in Norway
Brazilian expatriate women's footballers
Houston Dash players
National Women's Soccer League players
Footballers at the 2020 Summer Olympics
Sportspeople from Mato Grosso do Sul
Sport Club Internacional (women) players